Among Ravens is a 2014 American comedy-drama film directed by Russell Friedenberg and Randy Redroad and starring Amy Smart, Joshua Leonard, Christian Campbell, Victoria Smurfit, Natalie Imbruglia, Will McCormack, Johnny Sequoyah and Freidenberg.

Plot

Cast
Amy Smart as Wendy Conifer
Joshua Leonard as Ellis Conifer
Christian Campbell as Will Deville
Russell Friedenberg as Saul King
Victoria Smurfit as Emma
Natalie Imbruglia as Madison
Will McCormack as Chad Whitlock
Johnny Sequoyah as Joey
Castille Landon as Saturn Moon
Calum Grant as Hal Rice
Vinnie Duyck as Taxi Driver
Christopher Pinkalla as Jay

Reception
The film has a 10% rating on Rotten Tomatoes. Glenn Kenny of RogerEbert.com awarded the film one star.

References

External links
 
 

American comedy-drama films
Films about dysfunctional families
2014 comedy-drama films
2010s English-language films
2010s American films